Prymorskyi District is an urban district of the city of Mariupol, Ukraine.

The district was established in 1938.

Demographics
According to the 2001 census, the population of the district was 71,008 people, of whom 13.52% had Ukrainian as their mother tongue, 85.79% - Russian, 0.19% - Greek, 0.12% - Armenian, 0.09% - Belarusian, 0.06% - Romani, 0.03% - Moldovan (Romanian), 0.01% - Bulgarian, Jewish, Polish, German and Hungarian, as well as Gagauz and Slovak languages.

References

Urban districts of Mariupol